Samuel H. McLeary (1881 – July 2, 1924) was an aviation pioneer. He was one of the first 24 people chosen by the Aviation Section of the U.S. Signal Corp to be pilots.

Biography
He was born in 1881.

He was murdered by a hitchhiker on July 2, 1924 in Chesterfield, South Carolina. He was buried in Arlington National Cemetery.

References

External links
Samuel H. McLeary at Arlington National Cemetery

See also
 List of aviation pioneers

1881 births
1924 deaths
American aviators
Burials at Arlington National Cemetery